Megaxyela is a genus of sawflies in the family Xyelidae. There are about 13 described species in Megaxyela, found in the eastern Nearctic and in the southeastern part of East Asia. Two fossil species have been discovered, in Colorado and Shandong, China.

Megaxyela are external feeders of trees in the walnut family, Juglandaceae.

Species
These 13 species belong to the genus Megaxyela:

 Megaxyela bicoloripes (Rohwer, 1924)
 Megaxyela euchroma Blank, Shinohara & Wei, 2017
 Megaxyela fulvago Blank, Shinohara & Wei, 2017
 Megaxyela gigantea Mocsáry, 1909
 Megaxyela inversa Blank & D.R. Smith, 2017
 Megaxyela langstoni Ross, 1936, 2017
 Megaxyela major (Cresson, 1880)
 Megaxyela parki Shinohara, 1992
 Megaxyela pulchra Blank, Shinohara & Sundukov, 2017
 Megaxyela togashii Shinohara, 1992
 Megaxyela tricolor (Norton, 1862)
 † Megaxyela petrefacta Brues, 1908
 † Megaxyela yaoshanica Zhang, 1989

References

Sawflies